Drazark monastery (: Western Armenian:Trazarg), a destroyed monastic complex of  Armenian Apostolic Church  in Adana province of modern Turkey, which lies about 40 km. northwest of the city of Sis - historical capital of Cilician Armenia, at one of inaccessible slopes of Cilician Taurus range (middle part of the Taurus Mountains).

Etymology
Drazark in Armenian language directly means knock on the door. But beside Drazark the monastery was known by some other names:
 T'razark
 P'osivank
 Avag-vank

The Exterior
Summarizing recollections on Drazark frequently met numerous words like "big, inhabited by angels, notable, extremely outstanding" and similar characterizations which allows to suggest, this was a great monastic complex. Drazark consisted of 5 churches. Main church standing in the middle was called  Surb Astvatzatzin that in Armenian language means Holy Mother of God. Another 4 churches were attached to it by forming a cross: 
 Surb Nshan
 Surb P'rkich
 Surb Grigor
 Surb T'oros

History
The monastery's founding date is unknown, but the first mention of it appears in the 10th century AD. After the earthquake of 1114, Prince Toros I (~1100-1129) of the Rubenid Dynasty restored the monastery and added to it a mausoleum for the leadership of the Armenian Church in Cilicia and for the princely families of Armenian Cilicia, as well as an educational center. It also served as the bishop's residence for the Cilician capital of Sis. Prince Toros I invited people to head the construction, including Gevorg Meghrik Vaspurakantsi (George Meghrik from Vaspurakan) and Kirakos Gitnakan (Kirakos the Learned). At the request of the prince, these men remained there and, between 1050 to 1121 AD, launched an extravagant educational program, created and copied numerous manuscripts for the monks' brotherhood, and developed regulations whereby the monks must be occupied by reading and copying manuscripts. They edited the "Apostles' Acts" after translating them from Greek, interpreted St. John's Gospel, completed the volumes Book of Feasts and Lectionary, and translated several codices and testimonies. In 1114 after the death of Archimandrite Gevorg Meghrik, Kirakos Gitnakan was elected the monastery's new archimandrite. Years later, Archimandrite Barseh, a person endowed with special privileges, headed the monastery, followed by Archimandrite Samuel (1178–1181). Drazark monastery's archbishop of Sis, Hovannes (1198-1219), attended the coronation of King Levon I. Many notable personalities of the time thrived in Drazark monastery, such as Vardan Aygektsi, Arakel Hnazandents, Barseh Gitnavor, and Konstantin Lambronatsi, in whose time the monastery became a target for enemies (1305).

Drazark monastery was famed for its high level of education in music and languages, though it always encouraged overall development in its pupils. Toros P'ilisop'a (the Philosopher) and Hovsep Yerazhisht headed the monastic musicians, and various masters of medieval written language studied within the monastery's walls, including Hovhannes Arqayeghbayr (1220–1289, Bishop John of Sis, younger brother of King Hetum I), as well as Sargis Pitsak. The monastery also trained diplomats for the Armenian Kingdom of Cilicia, such as  Toros Philosopher, who was subsequently a statesman and ambassador of Cilician Armenia at the time of Levon II (1269–89) and Hetum II (1289–1307) to the kingdom of England. The monastery of Drazark continued to function even after the demise of Cilician Armenia and during the dark period of the Seljukid and Ottoman rule over Cilician Armenians during the next several centuries. At the time of the Cilician Massacre in 1909, Turks plundered the monastery and murdered its priests.  The monastery ceased to exist entirely a few years later during the Armenian genocide (1914-1923), sharing the fate of millions of Armenians who fell victim to Turks.

People buried in the monastic cemetery 

 Thoros I, Prince of Armenia
 Thoros II, Prince of Armenia
 Thoros III, King of Armenia
 Ruben III, Prince of Armenia
 King Hetum I
 Queen Zabel
 Catholicos Grigor IV Son
 Catholicos Grigor V K'aravehz
 Catholicos Konstantin I Bardzraberdtsi
 Catholicos Konstantin IV Lambronatsi
 Sargis Pitsak
 Gevorg Meghrik

Current condition 
The remains of Drazark monastery, especially its main church of Surb Astvatzatzin (Holy Mother of God), were still known to exist in 1930, but fell from memory as the Armenian population in the area was killed or deported. In 1981 the American archaeologist Robert W. Edwards discovered the ruins of an extensive medieval monastery and one surviving church of Armenian construction, located approximately 45 km WNW of Sis (Kozan) and known today as Sara Çiçek (“yellow flower”), which he tentatively identified as Drazark. The unexcavated church, which reveals a plan similar to the barrel-vaulted chapels of Greater Armenia, has a lower level with a conspicuous south entrance leading to a small reception area and possibly crypts.

The exact location of Drazark was established by Samvel Grigoryan in 2015. Samvel Grigoryan is the author of the first article on this topic published in May 2017 4.	« The location of Drazark, burial place of the kings and queens of Armenia and of the 'blessed Rubenians' », Handes Amsorya, Vienne - Erevan 2017, p. 61-84.. In 2015 at the Turkish village of Kibrislar, located approximately 40 km NNW of Sis, Jirair Christianian surveyed the medieval Armenian church (now converted into a mosque) and concluded very plausibly that this site was the monastic complex of Drazark.  Today, only a two-story church-mausoleum remains of the extensive complex of Drazark.  This structure most likely is the Holy Mother of God church, which housed in its lower floor the mausoleum where kings, queens, princes, as well as catholicoi and bishops of the church were buried.  The remains of Drazark exhibit the largest surviving assemblage of medieval Armenian sculptural elements in Cilicia, including a pair of monumental khatchkars, large sculpted stone crosses mounted in the upper story ashlar masonry of the church’s west façade, and an ogee arch with framing colonnettes and bordering geometric designs.  Inside the church many niches line the walls, attesting to a rich collection of relics.  The expansion of the upper story church and its sculptural decorations were likely added during the reigns of  King Het‛um I and his wife Queen Zapēl, or their son King Levon II and his wife Queen Keran, as both couples were devout patrons of the Church, and based on architectural parallels of the mid-13th century.

Cultural heritage from Drazark that reached our days 

However, the Matenadaran institute (repository of ancient Armenian manuscripts) in Yerevan has a collection containing over 40 handwritten books made at Drazark monastery. They are written partially at a parchment and decorated by miniature paintings done by hands of medieval authors of gilded paint with wide use of Vordan Karmir. In addition some of the manuscripts that was created in Drazark stored today in Matenadaran institute under the numbers: 154, 199, 1576, 3792, 3845, 3929, 5736, 6290, 10524. There is a Bibles, interpretations, motet writings, tutorials on natural sciences, the oldest copy of famous "Book of Lamentations" by Grigor Narekatsi  and so on.

References

External links 
 Kozan Kıbrıslar Köyü Cami: Kırsal Alanda Kiliseden Camiye Dönüştürülmüş Bir Yapının Mimari Analizi A mosque in Kıbrıslar village, Kozan - An architectural analysis of a building

Armenian churches in Turkey
Christian monasteries established in the 10th century
Demolished buildings and structures in Turkey
Armenian Kingdom of Cilicia
Armenian buildings in Turkey